Utang ng Ama is a 2003 Philippine comedy film directed by Tony Y. Reyes. The film stars Joey Marquez and Jinggoy Estrada. This is the last film produced by Maverick Films before closing shop.

Cast
 Joey Marquez as Don
 Jinggoy Estrada as Ruel
 Katya Santos as Justine
 Ruby Rodriguez as Ginger
 Phillip Salvador as Ipe
 Rudy Fernandez as Rudy
 Gary Lising as Pepe
 Cesar Montano as Self
 Ronnie Ricketts as Police Jailguard
 Lorna Tolentino as Doctora
 Bayani Agbayani as Bro. Bayani
 Vhong Navarro as Babaero
 Cynthia Yapchiongco as Madel
 Soxy Topacio as Direk
 La Bacci as Producer
 Yoyong Martirez as Konsehal
 Philip Cesar as Buyer
 Mahal as Nuno sa Punso
 Dagul as JR
 Baldo Marro as Boy Yabang
 Val Iglesias as Dong Yabang
 Rudy Meyer as Police Sergeant
 Danny Labra as Boy Balisong
 Gerald Ejercito as Bookies
 Jinky Oda as Faith Healer
 Joanne Salazar as Don's Girl

References

External links

2003 films
2003 action comedy films
Filipino-language films
Philippine comedy films
Maverick Films films
Films directed by Tony Y. Reyes